Slobodan Petrović (Serbian Cyrillic: Слободан Петровић; born 2 October 1948) is a Serbian retired footballer who played as a midfielder.

He was also known as Dane Petrović.

Biography
Petrović was born in Belgrade on 2 October 1948. He became a member of the pioneer team of Partizan at the age of six where he was coached by Florijan Matekalo. He has a brother, Miodrag, who also played for Partizan. At the age of seventeen, he made his debut for the first team of Partizan against Radnički in Niš. He played a total of 209 matches for the club. He continued his career in Nürnberg, for which he played about 400 matches overall in seven seasons and was the first foreign captain of a German team.

After the end of his playing career, he went into business and owns and operates a chicken farm.

References

External links
 

1948 births
Living people
Footballers from Belgrade
Yugoslav footballers
Serbian footballers
Association football midfielders
Yugoslav First League players
FK Partizan players
1. FC Nürnberg players